No. 6 (Yellow, White, Blue over Yellow on Gray) is an oil on canvas painting in color field style by Latvian-born American artist Mark Rothko created in 1954. No. 6 (Yellow, White, Blue over Yellow on Gray) is a prime exemplar of Rothko’s creative activity. After his experiments with mythological themes and Surrealism to express tragedy he turned to depicting irregular and painterly rectangular regions of color which he further abstracted into rectangular color forms.

Description 
The painting depicts three blurred blocks of yellow, white and blue opposed against a gray ground. He made the various layers of the painting dry quickly, without mixing of colors, so that he could soon create new layers on top of the earlier ones. The main purpose of Rothko is to express and communicate "basic human emotions, such as tragedy, ecstasy, doom etc." through the color relationships in his paintings. No. 6 (Yellow, White, Blue over Yellow on Gray) belongs to Rothko’s late period when he for seven years painted in oil only on large canvases with vertical formats. Very large-scale designs were used in order to overwhelm the viewer, or, in Rothko's words, to make the viewer feel "enveloped within" the painting.

Provenance 

 Estate of the artist (#5102.54)
 Marlborough A.G., Liechtenstein/Marlborough Gallery, Inc., New York
 Baron Leon Lambert, Brussels (acquired from the above in 1972)
 Christie’s, New York, May 5, 1987, lot 8
 Gallery Urban, Nagoya, New York and Paris 
Private Collection, New York (acquired from the above in 1991) 
C&M Arts, New York (acquired from the above in 1994) 
Mr. and Mrs. Dennis Alter, Pennsylvania 
C&M Arts, New York
Private Collection

Exhibitions 

 Chicago, Art Institute of Chicago, Gallery of Art Interpretation; 
 Providence, Rhode Island School of Design, Recent Paintings by Mark Rothko, October 1954 – February 1955;
 Zurich, Kunsthaus Zurich; 
 Berlin, Staatliche Museen Preussischer Kulturbesitz Neue Nationalgalerie;
 Düsseldorf, Kunsthalle Düsseldorf; 
Rotterdam, Museum Boymans-van-Beuningen;  
London, Hayward Gallery, Mark Rothko, March 1971 – March 1972, cat. no. 35, p. 61, illustrated in color (titled Yellow, White, Blue over Yellow on Gray); 
Basel, Galerie Beyeler, Landscapes and Horizons, October – December 1987, cat. no. 36.

References 

1954 paintings
Paintings by Mark Rothko